Bengal (Duc No Tranh) is a fictional character appearing in American comic books published by Marvel Comics.

Publication history

The character first appeared in Daredevil #258 and was created by Fabian Nicieza and artist Ron Lim.

Fictional character biography
Duc No Tranh was a boy growing up in a Vietnamese village during the Vietnam War. During the war, American soldiers, including William Talltrees, Willie Lincoln, and the future Reverend Michael Janes, massacre his village and parents. The boy tries to climb aboard the Americans' helicopter, but is kicked off by Private Janes, despite the pleas of the other soldiers on board.

Years later, the boy became the costumed Bengal and travels to America for revenge on the soldiers involved in the destruction of his village. Willie Lincoln seeks Daredevil's protection. The costumed hero defeats Bengal.

Bengal later attacks Father Michael Janes. He soon clashes with Silhouette and the other New Warriors over the fate of Janes. Bengal also fights Night Thrasher for the first time. His origin is recounted, and his battle with Night Thrasher is ended by the Punisher. Bengal befriends the New Warriors, and Bengal and Janes make peace with each other.

Despite this, Bengal still feels the need to avenge atrocities stemming from the Vietnam War. He comes to believe that Gai No Don, an acquaintance of Night Thrasher, was in reality, Li Pan, a Vietnamese general responsible for thousands of innocent deaths. Bengal battles security officers until he reaches Gai. He is confronted by Night Thrasher and Silhouette, whom Gai has hired. He is told Gai is not Li Pan. Bengal leaps out a window and escapes. Bengal later attacks the Poison Memories gang, a long time New Warriors enemy. He believes they have information on Li Pan. Again, Night Thrasher fights him. He is temporarily subdued and urged to move on.

Civil War/The Initiative
Bengal has been identified as one of the 142 registered superheroes who are being trained as part of the Initiative. He is seen being bussed into Camp Hammond, the super-human training facility built on the remains of Stamford. One of the many other passengers on the bus is Rage, one of the surviving New Warriors. Other passengers include Thor Girl, Komodo, Slapstick and Cloud 9.

As part of his training, he battles the Thing alongside many others of his class, with little success.

Bengal is the leader of the Initiative's black-ops team created by Henry Peter Gyrich. Soon after, the Hulk returns from deep space with an army and battles many of Earth's heroes. Some of the Camp Hammond recruits are captured and kept imprisoned in Madison Square Garden. Bengal, Constrictor, Mutant Zero and other operatives free the Hammond prisoners.

When the Shadow Initiative was fighting K.I.A., Constrictor was badly wounded and Bengal ran away with the body, with a last hope to save his friend.

Secret Invasion
During the Secret Invasion storyline, Bengal discovers that the Skrulls have taken over Camp Hammond. At first, he makes sure that children and staff at the Camp Hammond daycare are placed safely into a bomb shelter. He then summons the rest of the Shadow Initiative to deal with them. They find and recruit Ant-Man and decide to assassinate Queen Veranke, but the attempt fails and they are taken captive. They are freed after the invasion force is destroyed.

Siege
During the Siege storyline, Penance evades the guards and convinces Batwing, Bengal, and Butterball to help the Avengers Resistance. As Osborn's regime has fallen, Bengal moves with his family in Brooklyn where he opens a martial arts gym. He refuses all requests for interviews.

Powers, abilities, and equipment
Bengal is a martial arts master and an exceptional athlete. He is also an excellent acrobat, and a skilled archer and tracker. He typically fights with bow and arrows, or shuriken. His favorite weapons are paired sai-like weapons with blades that collapse or expand at the press of a button. He has an unusually well defined sense of smell and can track people by scent.

In other media

Video games
 Bengal appears in Lego Marvel's Avengers.

References

External links

Marvel Database Bengal entry

Characters created by Fabian Nicieza
Characters created by Ron Lim
Comics characters introduced in 1988
Fictional characters with superhuman senses
Fictional sole survivors
Fictional Vietnamese people
Marvel Comics male supervillains
Marvel Comics martial artists
Marvel Comics supervillains
Marvel Comics superheroes